Flag Boshielo Dam is a water reservoir on the Olifants River, near Marble Hall, Limpopo, South Africa. It was established in 1987.

See also
List of reservoirs and dams in South Africa
List of rivers of South Africa

References 
 List of South African Dams from the Department of Water Affairs and Forestry (South Africa)

Dams in South Africa
Dams completed in 1987